The 1982 Atlantic Coast Conference men's basketball tournament was held in Greensboro, North Carolina, at the Greensboro Coliseum from March 5–7. North Carolina defeated Virginia, 47–45, to win the championship. James Worthy of North Carolina was named the tournament MVP. Beginning with this tournament, the quarterfinals were played on Friday and the championship was held on Sunday. The finals continued to be held on Sunday until the 2015 tournament, which began with first-round games on Tuesday and ended with the final on Saturday night.

Bracket

References

Tournament
ACC men's basketball tournament
College sports tournaments in North Carolina
Basketball competitions in Greensboro, North Carolina
ACC men's basketball tournament
ACC men's basketball tournament